Luzira Maximum Security Prison is a maximum security prison for both men and women in Uganda. As at July 2016, it is the only maximum security prison in the country and houses Uganda's death row inmates.

Location
The prison is in the Luzira neighborhood in Nakawa Division in southeastern Kampala, Uganda's capital and largest city. The coordinates of the prison are 0°17'59.0"N, 32°38'26.0"E (Latitude:0.299735; Longitude:32.640556).

Overview
The prison houses both convicted and sentenced inmates, as well as suspects awaiting trial. It has a male section and female section. It also houses the country death row, amounting to about 500 men and women. A welfare project was carried out by installing windows, lighting, plumbing, furniture, mattresses and linen, as part of the African Prisons Project. The prison has a library of over 7,000 books from the United Kingdom.

Prison management
In Luzira, inmates are assigned more responsibility that would be in similar prisons in the United Kingdom or the United States. Inmates assume responsibility for maintenance of harmony and functionality of the units where they live, including the growing and harvesting of food, its preparation and its distribution within the prison. Learning is encouraged, with many men learning and teaching carpentry skills to others. The guard to prisoner ration in Luzira is about 1:35, compared to 1:15 in the UK. Aggression among inmates is the exception and not the rule. The recidivism rate in Luzira is less than 30 percent, compared with 46 percent in the UK and 76 percent in the United States.

Capacity
The prison was designed with capacity of 1,700 inmates, but often houses close to 8,000. On 27 August 2014, the day of the 2014 national population census, the prison housed 6,336 people; 3, 373 were in the Luzira Upper Prison, 1,495 were in Murchison Bay Prison, and Kampala Remand Prison had 1, 040 inmates. The Luzira Women’s Prison had 400 inmates and 28 children. The government of Uganda has plans to relocate the prison and expand it to capacity of 10,000. As of June 2017, the facility housed more than 8,500 inmates.

See also
 Kitalya Maximum Security Prison
 JLOS House Project

References

External links
Three inmates at Uganda’s maximum security prison and one former inmate presented with Diploma in Common Law

Prisons in Uganda
Buildings and structures in Kampala
Central Region, Uganda